Regurgitaliths are the fossilized remains of stomach contents that have been regurgitated by an animal. They are trace fossils and can be subdivided into ichnotaxa. Regurgitaliths might provide useful information on the diet of the animal, but are difficult to relate to any particular species.

See also
 Bezoar
 Bromalite
 Coprolite
 Gastrolith

References

Trace fossils